Okeden is a rural locality in the South Burnett Region, Queensland, Australia. In the  Okeden had a population of 26 people.

Geography 
The Boondooma Dam and its associated lake is on north-western boundary between Okeden and Boondooma.

History 
The locality shares its name with the parish, which in turn was named after pastoralist and public servant David Parry-Okeden who managed the Burrandowan pastoral run in the 1850s.

In the  Okeden had a population of 26 people.

Amenities 
There is a boat ramp and pontoon at the eastern side of dam on Boondooma Dam Road. It is managed by the South Burnett Regional Council.

Education 
There are no schools in Okeden. The nearest school, Proston State School in neighbouring Proston to the east, provides primary education and secondary education to Year 10. For secondary education to Year 12, the nearest school is Murgon State High School in Murgon to the east.

References 

South Burnett Region
Localities in Queensland